Sri Mariamman Temple, is situated at Valangaiman in Tiruvarur district of Tamil Nadu, India. It is found in Kumbakonam-Needamangalam road, at a distance of 9 km from Kumbakonam.

Temple structure

The temple has front mandapa, arthamandapa, sanctum sanctorum and prakara. In the mahamandapa, at the south Vinayaka and at the north Irulan, Pechiamman, Veeran with consorts are found. In the arthamandapa processional deities are kept. Sanctum sanctorum is in square size. In the south of the temple, temple tank is found.

Presiding deity
The presiding deity is known as Valangaiman Mariamman.

Pujas
Special pujas are held in this temple during the Tamil month of Aavani (August–September). Every Sunday is considered as festive day to this temple. This temple is opened from 6.00 a.m. to 12.00 noon and 5.00 p.m. to 8.00 p.m.

Strange custom
Devotees follow a strange custom of fulfilling by doing ritual with paadai generally used for carrying the dead body.

Mahasamprokshanam
The Mahasamprokshanam took place on 12 February 2020.

References

External links
 அருள்மிகு வலங்கைமான் மாரியம்மன் திருக்கோயில்
  Mariamman Temple, Valangaiman, Thiruvarur
 Valangaiman Sri Padaikatti Mariamman Temple Kumbabishekam

Hindu temples in Tiruvarur district